This list comprises all players who have participated in at least one league match for Colorado Rapids since the team's first Major League Soccer season in 1996. Players who were on the roster but never played a first team game are not listed; players who appeared for the team in other competitions (US Open Cup, CONCACAF Champions League, etc.) but never actually made an MLS appearance are noted at the bottom of the page.

A "†" denotes players who only appeared in a single match.

A
  Bismark Adjei-Boateng
  Junior Agogo
  Stefan Aigner
  Andre Akpan
  Carlos Alvarez
  Quincy Amarikwa
  Rafael Amaya
  Kevin Anderson
  Davy Armstrong
  Geoff Aunger †
  Micheal Azira

B
  Imad Baba
  Dominique Badji
  Marcelo Balboa
  Mehdi Ballouchy
  Shaun Bartlett
  Brian Bates
  Julien Baudet
  Kyle Beckerman
  Dedi Ben Dayan
  Scott Benedetti
  Jason Bent
  John Berner
  Alex Blake
  Johan Blomberg
  Yannick Boli
  Nat Borchers
  Jason Boyce
  Paul Bravo
  Adin Brown
  Deshorn Brown
  Roberto Brown
  Edson Buddle
  Marc Burch
  José Burciaga, Jr.
  Bobby Burling
  Preston Burpo
  Ian Butterworth

C
  Diego Calderón
  Caleb Calvert
  José Cancela
  Adrian Cann
  Joe Cannon
  Scott Cannon
  Chris Carrieri
  Tony Cascio
  Conor Casey
  Jorge Castañeda
  David Castellanos
  Dennis Castillo
  Edgar Castillo
  Jaime Castrillón
  Steward Ceus
  Marvin Chávez
  Mark Chung
  Jordan Cila
  Colin Clark
  Nico Colaluca
   Kip Colvey
  Miguel Comminges
  Terry Cooke
  Bouna Coundoul
  Matt Crawford
  Sam Cronin
  Leo Cullen
  Omar Cummings
  Jeff Cunningham

D
  Mike da Fonte
  Greg Dalby
  Chris Dawes
  Antonio de la Torre
  Alberto Delgado
  Raimo de Vries
  Jorge Dely Valdés
  Eric Denton
  Danny DeVall
  Raúl Díaz Arce
  Joey DiGiamarino
  Jeff DiMaria
  John DiRaimondo
  Facundo Diz
  Paul Dougherty
  Conor Doyle
  Kevin Doyle

E
  Danny Earls
  Edu
  Troy Edwards
  Charles Eloundou
  Facundo Erpen

F
  Ian Feuer
  Maynor Figueroa
  Caleb Folan
  Kortne Ford
  Byron Foss
  Robin Fraser
  Hunter Freeman

G
  Dan Gargan
  Scott Garlick
  Shkëlzen Gashi
  Josh Gatt
  Cory Gibbs
  Neathan Gibson
  Luis Gil
  Cornell Glen
  Rafael Gomes †
  Christian Gómez
  Herculez Gomez
  Luchi Gonzalez
  Alan Gordon
  Sasha Gotsmanov †
  Paul Grafer
  Kelly Gray
  Joseph Greenspan
  Brenton Griffiths †
  Rivers Guthrie †

H
  Marcus Hahnemann
  Marlon Hairston
  Sam Hamilton
  Denis Hamlett
  Jean Harbor
  Kevin Harbottle
  Ty Harden
  Michael Harrington
  Atiba Harris
  Wolde Harris
  Wes Hart
  Jordan Harvey
  Hárrison Henao †
  Chris Henderson
  Sean Henderson
  Stephen Herdsman
  Nicolás Hernández
  Kamani Hill
  Michael Holody
  Tim Howard
  Dusty Hudock

I
  Ugo Ihemelu
  Clint Irwin

J
  Danny Jackson †
  Niki Jackson
  Tahj Jakins
  Guillermo Jara
  Jermaine Jones
  José Mari
  Ian Joyce

K
  Macoumba Kandji
  Aitor Karanka
  Stephen Keel
  Lance Key
  Kosuke Kimura
  Zach Kingsley
  Dominic Kinnear
  Jovan Kirovski
  Chris Klute
  Matt Kmosko
  Zat Knight
  Ritchie Kotschau
  David Kramer

L
  Ross LaBauex
  Nick LaBrocca
  Jeff Larentowicz
  Sébastien Le Toux
  Ricky Lewis
  Anders Limpar
  Claudio López
  Amir Lowery

M
  Zac MacMath
  Marquinho
  Tyrone Marshall
  Tim Martin
  Chris Martinez
  Enzo Martínez
  Rey Ángel Martínez
  Thiago Martins
  Joe Mason
  Pablo Mastroeni
  Clint Mathis
  Jack McBean
  Josh McKay
  Matt McKeon
  Tam McManus
  Guy Melamed
  Germán Mera
  Eric Miller
  Drew Moor
  Jason Moore
  Martín Morales †
  Brian Mullan
  Danny Mwanga

N
  Joseph Nane
  Joe Nasco
  John Neeskens
  Ben Newnam †
  Alain N'Kong
  Fabrice Noël
  Pat Noonan
  Andre Nunley †
  Sanna Nyassi

O
  Ciaran O'Brien
  Matt Okoh
  Shane O'Neill
  Daniel Osorno

P
  Raúl Palacios
  Scott Palguta
  Marco Pappa
  David Patiño
  Ross Paule
  Russell Payne
  Adrián Paz
  Jacob Peterson
  Mike Petke
  Peguero Jean Philippe
  Matt Pickens
  Thomas Piermayr
  Lucas Pittinari
  Ed Pinon
  Darryl Powell
  Dillon Powers
  Jack Price
  Brandon Prideaux

Q
  Marvin Quijano

R
  Juan Ramírez
  Steve Rammel
  Gregory Richardson †
  James Riley
  Martín Rivero
  Alberto Rizo
  Zizi Roberts
  Felipe Rodriguez

S
  Mohammed Saeid
  Waldir Sáenz
  Vicente Sánchez
  Tony Sanneh
  Marcelo Sarvas
  Darren Sawatzky
  Casey Schmidt
  Ross Schunk
  Diego Serna
  Dillon Serna
  Steve Shak
  Musa Shannon
  Richard Sharpe
  Axel Sjöberg
  Jamie Smith
   Tommy Smith
  Luis Solignac
  John Spencer
  Eugene Sseppuya †
  Sean St Ledger
  Jeff Stewart
  Nathan Sturgis
  Gary Sullivan

T
  Melvin Tarley
  Hendry Thomas
  Keyeno Thomas
  Wells Thompson
  Zach Thornton †
  Rick Titus
  Gabriel Torres
  Seth Trembly
  Steve Trittschuh

V
  Carlos Valderrama
  Scott Vallow
  Grant Van De Casteele †
  Greg Vanney
  David Vaudreuil
  Peter Vermes
  Scott Vermillion
  Raimo de Vries

W
  Tyson Wahl
  Craig Waibel
  Anthony Wallace
  Daniel Wasson
  Jared Watts
  Roy Wegerle
  Marquis White
  Mekeil Williams
  Danny Wilson
  Chris Wingert
  Alan Woods †
  Chris Woods
   Deklan Wynne
  Marvell Wynne

Z
  Cesar Zambrano †
  Luis Zapata

References

Sources
 

Colorado Rapids
 
Association football player non-biographical articles